The 2014 Kehoe Cup was an inter-county and colleges hurling competition in the province of Leinster. The competition was ranked below the Walsh Cup and featured second and third tier counties and colleges from Leinster, Ulster and Connacht.

Format

16 teams compete in a straight knockout tournament. Drawn games go to extra time; if drawn after extra time, a replay is played.

The 8 teams that lose in the first round go into the Kehoe Cup Shield, which is also a straight knockout tournament.

Teams

County teams: (10)
Derry
Down
Fingal
Kildare
Longford
Louth
Mayo
Meath
Roscommon
Wicklow
Third level: (6)
DCU
Galway-Mayo Institute of Technology (GMIT)
Maynooth University
Queen's University Belfast
St Patrick's College, Drumcondra
Trinity College Dublin

Results

Final

Kehoe Shield

Final

References

Kehoe Cup
Kehoe Cup